Crimson Street is a film directed by David Lai and produced by  . Released in 1982, it is a story about a night club singer who involved in a love tangle with three men. The lead role is played by Sally Yeh.

Story
The film combines action, comedy and romance to add to the story of Sally a night club who is romantically involved with three men, one of whom is Stone (played by Kenny Bee). Stone is a bank robber who has recently been released from prison. Another man she is involved with is a night club owner Paul King (played by Chan Wai-Man). The third man in the 4 player love-tangle is a policeman called Pow (played by Melvin Wong).

Background
For his part in the film, Chan Wai-Man was a 2nd Annual Hong Kong Film Awards best actor nominee. The film boosted the star profile of Sally Yeh.

Cast
 Sally Yeh   ..... Sally 
 Kenny Bee  ... Stone 
 Michael Chan ..... Paul King 
 Melvin Wong ..... Pow 
 Leung Mei-King  ..... Fatty's girl 
 James Barrett  ..... Mr. Cook 
 Cheng Mang-Ha  ..... Stone's mom 
 Steve Mak   ..... Cop 
 Mr. X  ..... Monkow 
 Sze Kai-Keung  ..... Fatty 
 Sam Sorono  ..... Thug 
 Tam Wai  ..... Thug 
 Chan Ling-Wai  ... Waiter 
 Woh Seung  ..... Waiter 
 Wong Yat-Fei  ..... Fortune teller 
 San Sin  ..... Kidnapper 
 Chan Leung  ..... Kidnapper

References

External links
 Imdb: Sha ren ai qing jie aka Crimson Street
 Darkside Reviews: Crimson Street
 So Good Hong Kong DVD Reviews: Crimson Street (1982) Directed by: David Lai

1982 films
Films directed by David Lai
Hong Kong romantic action films